Mike Boon (born 1970, Hastings, New Zealand), a stand-up comedian from New Zealand.

Career

Comedy
After establishing himself as an original performer and writer of sketch and character comedy, he emigrated to the United Kingdom. In 2003 he performed The Boon Show: Live at the Edinburgh Fringe Festival.

External links 
 Mike Boon
 Chortle.co.uk
 Edinburgh Festivals

1970 births
New Zealand comedians
New Zealand stand-up comedians
Living people
People from Hastings, New Zealand